Viggianello may refer to:

 Viggianello, Basilicata, town and comune in the province of Potenza, in the Southern Italian region of Basilicata
 Viggianello, Corse-du-Sud, commune in the Corse-du-Sud department of France on the island of Corsica